The Philippines competed at the 2013 World Championships in Athletics in Moscow, Russia, from 10–18 August 2013. A team of 2 athletes was initially announced to represent the country in the event. Only one Filipino athlete, Eric Cray participated in the tournament. He participated in the 400 Metres Hurdles.

Results

Men
Track and road events

References

External links
IAAF World Championships – Philippines

Nations at the 2013 World Championships in Athletics
World Championships in Athletics
2013